Zarandona is a village in Murcia, Spain. It is part of the municipality of Murcia.

Murcia
Populated places in the Region of Murcia